The McKendrick–von Foerster equation is a linear first-order partial differential equation encountered in several areas of mathematical biology – for example, demography and cell proliferation modeling; it is applied when age structure is an important feature in the mathematical model. It was first presented by Anderson Gray McKendrick in 1926 as a deterministic limit of lattice models applied to epidemiology, and subsequently independently in 1959 by biophysics professor Heinz von Foerster for describing cell cycles.

Mathematical formula
The mathematical formula can be derived from first principles. When , we have:

It relates that a population ages, and that fact is the only one that influences change in population density; the negative sign shows that time flows in just one direction, that there is no birth and the population is going to die out.

Derivation 
Suppose that for a change in time  and change in age , the population density is:That is, during a time period  the population density decreases by a percentage . Taking a Taylor series expansion to order  gives us that:We know that , since the change of age with time is 1. Therefore, after collecting terms, we must have that:

Analytical solution

The von Foerster equation is a continuity equation; it can be solved using the method of characteristics. Another way is by similarity solution; and a third is a numerical approach such as finite differences.

To get the solution, the following boundary conditions should be added:

which states that the initial births should be conserved (see Sharpe–Lotka–McKendrick’s equation for otherwise), and that:

which states that the initial population must be given; then it will evolve according to the partial differential equation.

Similar equations

In Sebastian Aniţa, Viorel Arnăutu, Vincenzo Capasso. An Introduction to Optimal Control Problems in Life Sciences and Economics (Birkhäuser. 2011),  this equation appears as a special case of the Sharpe–Lotka–McKendrick’s equation; in the latter there is inflow, and the math is based on directional derivative. The McKendrick’s equation appears extensively in the context of cell biology as a good approach to model the eukaryotic cell cycle.

See also
Finite difference method
Partial differential equation
Renewal theory
Continuity equation
Volterra integral equation

References

Diffusion
Parabolic partial differential equations
Stochastic differential equations
Transport phenomena
Equations of physics
Mathematical and theoretical biology
Ecology
Demography
Epidemiology